Dracut Senior High School is the public senior high school in the Merrimack Valley town of Dracut, Massachusetts, United States.

The high school's colors are Columbia blue, navy blue, white and gold. The team name is the Middies and the symbol is an anchor, or a “Block ‘D’”.  These are references to midshipmen, as historically, the town was a place where U.S. Navy uniforms were created. The original Dracut High was built in the early 1950s and was frequently overcrowded, as roughly 1,600 students attend the school that was built for a fraction of that number, approximately 900. However, in 2011, the Massachusetts School Building Authority approved funding to construct a new Dracut High School. The majority of the project is  completed as of October 2014.

Dracut is known for their performing arts program, specifically for their show choir, a cappella vocal ensemble, and marching band.

Demographics

References

External links
 
 Dracut High School Sports
 https://web.archive.org/web/20120816044123/http://dracutps.org/dracut-high-school/high-school-renovation-project

Merrimack Valley Conference
Schools in Middlesex County, Massachusetts
Public high schools in Massachusetts